This topic reveals a large number of triathlon events and their results for 2014.

Winter triathlon
 January 26: 2014 ETU Winter Triathlon European Cup in  Sigulda
 Winner:  Branislav Dubeī
 February 15 & 16: 2014 ITU Winter Triathlon World Championships at  Cogne
 Men's winner:  Pavel Andreev
 Women's winner:  Borghild Løvset
 March 8 & 9: 2014 ITU Winter Triathlon Event in  Quebec City
 Men's winner:  Dušan Šimočko
 Women's winner:  Annie Gervais

Long distance triathlon
 March 2: 2014 PATCO Long Distance Triathlon Pan American Championships in  Santa Marta
 Men's winner:  David Guete
 Women's winner:  Ewa Bugdol
 September 13: 2014 ETU Challenge Long Distance Triathlon European Championships in  Almere – Amsterdam
 Men's winner:  Markus Fachbach
 Women's winner:  Heleen Bij de Vaate
 September 21: 2014 ITU Long Distance Triathlon World Championships at  Weihai
 Men's winner:  Bertrand Billiard
 Women's winner:  Camilla Pedersen

Duathlon
 March 8 – November 17: 2014 ITU Duathlon Championships
 March 8: 2014 ATU Standard and Long Distance Duathlon African Championships in  Pretoria
 Men's winner:  Gordan Petkovic 
 Women's winner:  Olga Firsova 
 April 12: 2014 ETU Powerman Long Distance and Sprint Duathlon European Championships in  Horst aan de Maas
 Men's long distance winner:  Rob Woestenborghs 
 Men's sprint winner:  Sergio Silva
 Women's long distance winner:  Jenny Schulz
 Women's sprint winner:  Franziska Scheffler
 April 13: 2014 ETU Duathlon Balkan Championships in  Brașov
 Men's winner:  David Ruzsas
 Women's winner:  Eszter Dudás
 May 31 & June 1: 2014 ITU Duathlon World Championships at  Pontevedra
 Men's winner:  Benoît Nicolas
 Women's winner:  Sandra Lévénez 
 August 23 & 24: 2014 ETU Powerman Junior and Standard Distance Duathlon European Championships in  Weyer
 Junior Men's winner:  George Goodwin
 Junior Women's winner:  Federica Parodi
 Junior 4xMixed Relay winner: Team 
 4xMixed Relay winner: Team 
 November 15 – 17: 2014 ASTC Duathlon Asian Beach Games in  Nai Yang Beach, Phuket Island
 Men's Duathlon winner:  Ryo Sueoka
 Women's Duathlon winner:  Yurie Kato
 Mixed Duathlon Team Relay winners: Team  
 Men's Triathlon winner:  Heo Min-ho
 Women's Triathlon winner:  Ai Ueda
 Mixed Triathlon Team Relay winners: Team

World Cup
 March 15 – October 18: 2014 ITU Triathlon World Cup
 March 15: 2014 Mooloolaba ITU Triathlon World Cup #1 in 
 Men's winner:  Mario Mola
 Women's winner:  Gwen Jorgensen
 March 23: 2014 New Plymouth ITU Triathlon World Cup #2 in 
 Men's winner:  Mario Mola
 Women's winner:  Katie Hursey
 May 10 & 11: 2014 Chengdu ITU Triathlon World Cup #3 in 
 Men's winner:  Wian Sullwald
 Women's winner:  Gillian Backhouse
 June 15: 2014 Huatulco ITU Triathlon World Cup #4 in 
 Men's winner:  Luciano Taccone
 Women's winner:  Ai Ueda
 July 26 & 27: 2014 Jiayuguan City ITU Triathlon World Cup #5 in 
 Men's winner:  Vladimir Turbayevskiy
 Women's winner:  Maria Cześnik
 August 9 & 10: 2014 Tiszaújváros ITU Triathlon World Cup #6 in 
 Men's winner:  Akos Vanek
 Women's winner:  Rachel Klamer
 September 27 & 28: 2014 Alanya ITU Triathlon World Cup #7 in 
 Men's winner:  Sven Riederer
 Women's winner:  Maaike Caelers
 October 5: 2014 Cozumel ITU Triathlon World Cup #8 in 
 Men's winner:  Etienne Diemunsch
 Women's winner:  Nicola Spirig
 October 12: 2014 Cartagena ITU Triathlon World Cup #9 in 
 Men's winner:  Pierre le Corre
 Women's winner:  Nicola Spirig
 Men's winner:  Henri Schoeman
 Women's winner:  Emma Jackson

Cross triathlon
 March 29 – September 21: 2014 ITU Cross Triathlon Championships
 March 29: 2014 ASTC Cross Triathlon South Asian Championships at  Pokhara
 Men's winner:  Basanta Chaudhari
 Women's winner:  Pooja Chaurushi
 May 10: 2014 ATU Cross Triathlon African Championships at  Buffelspruit
 Men's winner:  Theo Blignaut
 Women's winner:  Carla Van Huyssteen
 June 1: 2014 ETU TNatura Cross Triathlon European Championships at  Orosei, Sardinia
 Men's winner:  Kris Coddens
 Women's winner:  Katrin Müller 
 June 22: 2014 ETU TNatura Cross Triathlon European Cup at  Přední Výtoň
 Men's winner:  Jan Kubicek 
 Women's winner:  Renata Bucher
 July 13: 2014 ETU TNatura Cross Triathlon European Cup at  Schluchsee
 Men's winner:  Kris Coddens
 Women's winner:  Katrin Müller 
 August 16: 2014 ITU Cross Triathlon World Championships at  Zittau
 Men's winner:  Ruben Ruzafa
 Women's winner:  Katrin Müller
 September 21: 2014 ETU TNatura Cross Triathlon European Cup at  Pokljuka
 Men's winner:  Kris Coddens
 Women's winner:  Helena Erbenova

World Triathlon Series
 April 5 – September 1: 2014 ITU World Triathlon Series
 April 5 & 6 at  Auckland
 Winners:  Francisco Javier Gómez Noya (men);  Jodie Stimpson (women)
 April 26 & 27 at  Cape Town
 Winners:  Francisco Javier Gómez Noya (men);  Jodie Stimpson (women)
 May 17 & 18 at  Yokohama
 Winners:  Francisco Javier Gómez Noya (men);  Gwen Jorgensen (women)
 May 31 & June 1 at  London
 Winners:  Mario Mola (men);  Gwen Jorgensen (women)
 June 27 – 29 at  Chicago
 Winners:  Francisco Javier Gómez Noya (men);  Gwen Jorgensen (women)
 July 12 & 13 at  Hamburg
 Winners:  Alistair Brownlee (men);  Gwen Jorgensen (women)
 August 23 & 24 at  Stockholm
 Winners:  Jonathan Brownlee (men);  Sarah Groff (women)
 August 26 – September 1 at  Edmonton (final)
 Winners:  Alistair Brownlee (men);  Gwen Jorgensen (women)
 Overall Men's Winner:  Francisco Javier Gómez Noya
 Overall Women's Winner:  Gwen Jorgensen

Aquathlon
 May 31: 2014 ETU Aquathlon European Championships at  Cologne
 Men's winner:  Oleksiy Syutkin
 Women's winner:  Tereza Zimovjanova 
 August 27: 2014 ITU Aquathlon World Championships at  Edmonton (part of the final 2014 World Triathlon Series event)
 Men's winner:  Yuichi Hosoda
 Women's winner:  Anneke Jenkins

Other
 June 20 – 22: 2014 ETU Triathlon European Championships in  Kitzbühel
 Men's winner:  Alistair Brownlee
 Women's winner:  Nicola Spirig
 June 28 & 29: 2014 ETU Triathlon U23 and Youth European Championships in  Penza
 Men's U23 winner:  Gordon Benson
 Women's U23 winner:  Elena Danilova 
 U23 4X Mixed Relay winner: 
 Men's Youth Team Relay winner: 
 Women's Youth Team Relay winner: 
 July 13: 2014 ITU Triathlon Mixed Relay World Championships in  Hamburg (the event is part of the overall sixth ITU World Triathlon Series competition)
 Winner:  (Lucy Hall, Jonathan Brownlee, Vicky Holland, and Alistair Brownlee)
 August 17 – 21: 2014 Summer Youth Olympics
 Boys':   Ben Dijkstra;   Daniel Hoy;   Emil Deleuran Hansen
 Girls':   Brittany Dutton;   Stephanie Jenks;   Emilie Morier
 4x Mixed Relay:  Team Europe #1;  Team Europe #3;  Team Oceania #1

References

 
Triathlon by year